The 1958 Ivy League football season was the third season of college football play for the Ivy League and was part of the 1958 NCAA University Division football season. The season began on September 27, 1958, and ended on November 27, 1958. Ivy League teams were 7–7 against non-conference opponents and Dartmouth won the conference championship.

Season overview

Schedule

Week 1

Week 2

Week 3

Week 4

Week 5

Week 6

Week 7

Week 8

Week 9

References